Semystra was a town of ancient Thrace. Dionysius of Byzantium wrote that there was an altar of the nymph Semystra there, whence the name of the town. Semystra was a nymph, she nurtured the Keroessa, who was the daughter of Io and Zeus.
Dionysius added that Semystra nearly became a big city during the Greek colonization, since the leaders of the colonization tried to found the city, but during the sacrifices, a crow snatched one of the thighs from the middle of the flames and carried it to the Bosporion promontory. The rest of the Greeks saw this as a sign from Apollo and went to the spot were the crow left the thigh.

Its site is located at the head of the Golden Horn in European Turkey.

References

Populated places in ancient Thrace
Former populated places in Turkey
Roman towns and cities in Turkey
History of Istanbul Province